Éliane Sophie Plewman (6 December 1917 – 13 September 1944) was a British agent of Special Operations Executive (SOE) and member of the French Resistance working as a courier for the "MONK circuit" in occupied France during World War II. SOE's objective was to conduct espionage, sabotage and reconnaissance against the Axis Powers, especially Nazi Germany in occupied Europe and to aid local resistance movements.
Plewman was captured by the Gestapo, and later executed by the SS in Dachau.

Pre-war life
Plewman was born Éliane Sophie Browne-Bartroli in Marseille, France. The daughter of Eugene Henry Browne-Bartroli, an English manufacturer based in France, and his Spanish wife Elisa Francesca (née Bartroli), she was educated in England and in Spain at the British School in Madrid. 

When she finished college she moved to Leicester to work for a clothing and fabric import/export company in Albion Street, using her language skills in English, French, Spanish and some Portuguese.

World War II

After the outbreak of the Second World War in 1939, Plewman worked for the Press Section of the British Embassies in Madrid and Lisbon until 1941. In 1942, she returned to Britain to work for the Spanish Press section of the Ministry of Information. 

On 28 July 1942, Plewman married Thomas Langford "Tom" Plewman (1911–2000) in Lutterworth, Leicestershire. Originally from Athy in County Kildare, Ireland, he had recently been commissioned as an officer in the Royal Artillery. Their home was at 14 Queen's Gate Terrace, Leicester.

Special Operations Executive
In mid-February 1943, Plewman joined the Special Operations Executive (SOE) and was accepted on 25 February 1943 for training to serve as an "agent in the field". Plewman signed the Official Secrets Act on 29 March 1943 and a second time on 19 April 1943 (this time as second lieutenant Auxiliary Territorial Service) and commenced training at Wanborough Manor at the start of May 1943. 
Despite her sylph-like figure and tiny frame – she was just over five feet tall – Plewman took the same training course near Inverness as the men did, showing determination in every exercise. She learnt weapons handling, hand-to-hand combat, techniques for sabotage, clandestine survival, security, orientation, radio communications. Plewman also learnt how to kill with – or without – a weapon, how to handle explosives and detonators, sabotage railway lines, blow up trains, take on a new identity, improvise answers to any question, invent a plausible past and cover story, including a likely occupation, without ever giving herself away or contradicting herself. Plewman passed the psychological tests set for future agents by the various officers in charge of evaluating candidates, tests which assessed their determination and mental fortitude. Her trainers described her as "calm, efficient, and conscientious, and with admirable composure" and "a great asset to the gaiety of the party."

After two failed attempts on preceding nights due to bad weather, Plewman parachuted into France on the night of 13/14 August 1943 from a special duties Handley Page Halifax Mark II bomber of No. 161 Squadron RAF from an altitude of little over 1,000 feet, keeping low to avoid German radar. Her cover name was "Eliane Jacqueline Prunier", her codenames were "Gaby" and "Dean", or sometimes "Madame Dupont". Plewman worked for Captain Charles Milne Skepper (alias "Henri Truchot"), the organiser of SOE's Monk circuit, in which she was to be the courier in the area of Marseille, Roquebrune and St. Raphael, providing the communications link between groups of saboteurs and intelligence gathering agents, Monk's wireless operator Arthur Steele, and other involved groups.

Major General Colin Gubbins Head of SOE wrote as a part of his recommendation for Plewman's gallantry award: 
"She was dropped in the Jura and was separated from her circuit for some time. Instead of remaining in hiding she showed outstanding initiative and made several contacts on her own which were later of great value to her circuit. For six months Plewman worked as a courier and her untiring devotion to duty and willingness to undergo any risk largely contributed to the successful establishment of her circuit. She travelled constantly maintaining liaison between the various groups, acting as guide to newly arriving agents and transporting wireless telegraphy equipment and compromising documents."

At this time Plewman's older brother, Albert John Browne-Bartroli, was working as an SOE agent in a different part of France. He survived the war and was awarded a Distinguished Service Order. Browne-Bartroli (codename "Tiburce") had, after undergoing identical training, become head of SOE's Ditcher circuit, which was active in Bourgogne from October 1943 to September 1944, which he led until the Allies' final victory. Tiburce received, on 14 July 1944, the biggest parachute drop of arms ever made to the maquis in daylight.

Capture and imprisonment

Plewman's organiser Charles Skepper and several other people were arrested in Marseilles about 23 March 1944 when the Gestapo raided a safe house.  The Germans left agents behind in the apartment to arrest any other agents who came to the house.  The next day Plewman and wireless operator Arthur Steele came to the apartment. Plewman was regarded as impulsive by her colleagues and despite suspicions that the safe house was compromised, she rang the doorbell. Two Germans opened the door and captured her.  Plewman was taken to Gestapo headquarters. After being interrogated for three or four weeks, she was transferred to Fresnes Prison in Paris where seven other female SOE agents were also incarcerated. On 12 May 1944, the eight women were transported to Karlsruhe prison in Germany.

Execution

During the night of 11 September 1944, the Gestapo collected Éliane Plewman, Yolande Beekman and Madeleine Damerment from the prison and drove them to Karlsruhe railway station in time to catch the early train to Munich. From there they caught a local train to Dachau and late in the evening walked to Dachau concentration camp arriving at about midnight. Between 0800 and 1000 hours the next morning, 13 September 1944, Plewman and three other SOE agents (Yolande Beekman, Madeleine Damerment and Noor Inayat Khan) were taken from their cell and forced to kneel in pairs before being executed by a single shot to the head by executioner Wilhelm Ruppert.

A Gestapo man named Max Wassmer was in charge of prisoner transports at Karlsruhe and accompanied the women to Dachau. Another Gestapo man named Christian Ott gave a statement to American investigators after the war as to the fate of Plewman and her three companions. Ott was stationed at Karlsruhe and volunteered to accompany the four women to Dachau as he wanted to visit his family in Stuttgart on the return journey. Though not present at the execution, Ott told investigators what Wassmer had told him.

The four prisoners had come from the barrack in the camp, where they had spent the night, into the yard where the shooting was to be done. Here he [Wassmer] had announced the death sentence to them. Only the Lagerkommandant and the two SS men had been present. The German-speaking Englishwoman (the major) had told her companion of this death sentence. All four had grown very pale and wept; the major asked whether they could protest against the sentence. The Kommandant declared that no protest could be made against the sentence. The major had then asked to see a priest. The camp Kommandant refused this on the grounds that there was no priest in the camp.

The four prisoners now had to kneel with their heads towards a small mound of earth and were killed by the two SS, one after another by a shot through the back of the neck. During the shooting the two Englishwomen held hands and the two French-women likewise. For three of the prisoners the first shot caused death, but for the German-speaking Englishwoman [Beekman] a second shot had to be fired as she still showed signs of life after the first shot.

After the shooting of these prisoners the Lagerkommandant said to the two SS men that he took a personal interest in the jewellery of the women and that this should be taken into his office.

This cannot be considered a reliable account as Ott told the investigator he had asked Wasser the following question after being told what had happened to the women: "But tell me, what really happened", to which Wasser replied: "So you want to know how it really happened?"

Honours and awards

Éliane Plewman is remembered on the Brookwood Memorial in Surrey (Panel 26 Column 3), and the F Section Memorial, in Valençay, France. In 1998 the Mayor of Marseille unveiled a plaque on 8, rue Mérentié to commemorate the place where Plewman, Charles Skepper and Arthur Steele, all Monk agents, were arrested by the Gestapo; and, in the 13th arondissement, a street was named in her honour.

 King's Commendation for Brave Conduct awarded posthumously in the London Gazette 20 August 1946. "For services in France during the enemy occupation".
 Croix de Guerre 1939-1945 with bronze star (France) on 16 January 1946.

Major General Colin Gubbins recommended Éliane Plewman for an MBE (Member of the Order of the British Empire) on 13 July 1945; however he was over-ruled, as the statutes of the award do not allow posthumous awards, and instead she was awarded the King's Commendation for Brave Conduct.

Notes
Post-war investigations determined very clear evidence of the fate of the group of female British SOE agents and unlike some of their colleagues, their families had detailed accounts of their time in captivity and of their deaths. Eliane Plewman's estate was settled on 25 April 1947.

References

Citations

Bibliography

 
 
 
  Overview of the 39 female SOE agents.

Further reading

  Overview of the French Resistance.
  Focus on the four female SOE agents (Borrel, Leigh, Olschanezky and Rowden) executed in the Natzweiler-Struthof concentration camp.
  A once classified report compiled in 1946 by a former member of SOE's F Section, Major Robert Bourne-Patterson, who was a planning officer.
  Buckmaster was the head of SOE's F Section, who infamously ignored security checks by captured SOE wireless operators that indicated their capture, resulting in agents being captured and executed.
  Comprehensive coverage of the French Resistance.
  
  Overview of SOE (Foot won the Croix de Guerre as a SAS operative in Brittany, later becoming Professor of Modern History at Manchester University and an official historian of the SOE).
  Detailed look at SOE casualties and selected stories that are representative of the experience of SOE personnel.
 
 
  The second and most recent biography of Rowden.
  A thorough overview of SOE.
  The first biography of Rowden.
  Overview of the scores of female SOE agents sent into occupied Europe during WW2 including Borrel.
  Comprehensive coverage of the German occupation of France.
  Look at the lives of women in Paris during WW2.
  Overview of Atkins' activity at SOE (served as Buckmaster's intelligence officer in the F Section).
  Written by the son of Major Francis Suttill, the Prosper network chief executed by the Nazis in 1945.
  Documents the activities of female SOE agents in France including Borrel.
  Documents the activities of female OSS and SOE agents in France including Borrel.
  Documents RAF small aircraft landings in France during WW2 (author was one of the pilots).
  Overview of SOE activities.

External links
 Spartacus Educational about Eliane Plewman
 Directory of SOE agents, biographical sketch of Eliane Plewman
 The story of the "Monk" network and the capture of its agents

1917 births
1944 deaths
People from Marseille
Executed spies
Female wartime spies
French Resistance members
Female resistance members of World War II
French people who died in Dachau concentration camp
French people of English descent
French people of Spanish descent
Spies who died in Nazi concentration camps
Recipients of the Queen's Commendation for Brave Conduct
Recipients of the Croix de Guerre 1939–1945 (France)
French people executed in Nazi concentration camps
People executed by Nazi Germany by firearm
Executed people from Provence-Alpes-Côte d'Azur
People from Leicester
British people executed in Nazi concentration camps
Resistance members killed by Nazi Germany
French Special Operations Executive personnel
British Special Operations Executive personnel
Special Operations Executive personnel killed in World War II
Auxiliary Territorial Service officers